Rudravaram  is a village in Santhanuthalapadu mandal, Prakasam district, Andhra Pradesh, India.

References
Villages in Prakasam district